Kōzaburō, Kozaburo or Kouzaburou (written: 康三郎, 孝三郎 or 公三郎) is a masculine Japanese given name. Notable people with the name include:

, Japanese composer
, Japanese activist and ultranationalist
, Japanese photographer
, Japanese film director

See also
Kosaburo

Japanese masculine given names